Gary Hubler (June 14, 1955 – September 14, 2007) was a crop duster and commercial transport pilot with over 17,000 flight hours from Caldwell, Idaho. He was most notable for being Champion of the Formula 1 class of the Reno Air Races from 2002 through 2006.

Death 

Hubler was killed just after 9:30 a.m. on September 14, 2007, when his modified Tuttle Cassutt IIIM aircraft, Mariah, and another aircraft piloted by Jason Somes collided. The NTSB concluded the probable cause was "the failure of the pilots of both aircraft to maintain an adequate visual lookout and clearance from one another during a low altitude aerial race."

References 

1955 births
2007 deaths
American aviators
Aviators from Idaho
Aviators killed in aviation accidents or incidents in the United States
People from Caldwell, Idaho
Sports deaths in Nevada
Victims of aviation accidents or incidents in 2007